The following is a list of all IFT-licensed over-the-air television stations broadcasting in the Mexican state of Colima. There are 16 television stations in Colima.

List of television stations

|-

|-

|-

|-

|-

|-

|-

|-

|-

|-

|-

|-

|-

|-

|-

Notes

References

Television stations in Colima
Coli